Antonio Díaz Gil (10 May 1934 – 5 April 2014), commonly known as Liz II, was a Spanish footballer who played as a forward.

Club career
Born in Seville, Liz II played only for clubs in his native Andalusia, the sole exception being RC Celta de Vigo. He also represented, in an eight-year professional career, Coria CF, Granada CF, Sevilla FC, Cádiz CF and Xerez CD. With Sevilla, where he coincided with legendary manager Helenio Herrera, he scored his only goal in La Liga, in a 3–0 home win against Deportivo Alavés on 13 November 1955.

Liz II died in his hometown on 5 April 2014, one month shy of his 80th birthday.

Personal life
Antonio's older brother, Manuel, was also a footballer and a forward. He too represented Sevilla.

References

External links

Stats and bio at Cadistas1910 

1934 births
2014 deaths
Footballers from Seville
Spanish footballers
Association football forwards
La Liga players
Segunda División players
Tercera División players
Coria CF players
Sevilla FC players
Granada CF footballers
Cádiz CF players
RC Celta de Vigo players
Xerez CD footballers